Dubovo is a rural locality (a village) in Denisovskoye Rural Settlement, Gorokhovetsky District, Vladimir Oblast, Russia. The population was 15 as of 2010.

Geography 
Dubovo is located 34 km southwest of Gorokhovets (the district's administrative centre) by road. Novosemenovka is the nearest rural locality.

References 

Rural localities in Gorokhovetsky District